Ukrainian Ye (Є є; italics: Є є) is a character of the Cyrillic script. It is a separate letter in the Ukrainian alphabet (8th position since 1992, 7th position before then), the Pannonian Rusyn alphabet, and both the Carpathian Rusyn alphabets; in all of these, it comes directly after Е. In modern Church Slavonic, it is considered a variant form of Ye (Е е)  (there, the selection of Є and Е is driven by orthography rules). Until the mid-19th century, Є/є was also used in Romanian and Serbian (the letter was eliminated in Vuk Karadžić's alphabet and replaced by digraph је). Other modern Slavonic languages may use Є/є shapes instead of Е/е for decorative purposes. Then, the letter is usually referred to by the older name Yest (which also refers to the conventional Ye). If the two need to be distinguished, the descriptive name Broad E is sometimes used (in contrast with "Narrow E").

(See usage for more detail.)

See scientific transliteration of Cyrillic.

Ukrainian Ye also looks like a backwards version of Э judging by their appearance. (Є/Э)

History
Letter Є/є was derived from one of the variant forms of Cyrillic Ye (Е е), known as "broad E" or "anchor E". Є-shaped letters can be found in late uncial (ustav) and semi-uncial (poluustav) Cyrillic manuscripts, especially ones of Ukrainian origin. Typically it corresponds to the letter Iotated E (Ѥ ѥ) of older monuments. Certain old primers and grammar books of Church Slavonic language had listed Є/є as a letter distinct from Е/е and placed it near the end of the alphabet (the exact alphabet position varies). Among modern-style Cyrillic scripts (known as "civil script" or "Petrine script"), Є/є was first used in Serbian books (end of the 18th century and first half of the 19th century); sometimes, Serbian printers might be using Э/э instead of Є/є due to font availability. For the modern Ukrainian language, Є/є has been used since 1837 (orthography of almanach "Русалка Днѣстровая" (Rusalka Dnistrovaya)). In Cyrillic numerals, Є is always preferred to E to represent 5.

Usage

Ukrainian and Rusyn
In Ukrainian and Rusyn (as well as in old Serbian orthography), Є/є represents the sound combination  or the vowel sound  after a palatalized consonant.

Khanty
In Khanty, the letter represents the sound /je/.

Old Slavonic, Old East Slavic 
In the oldest Slavonic manuscripts, Є was just a graphical variant of Е and thus represents  without palatalization. Later Є replaced Ѥ (i.e. denotes  after consonants and  after vowels and in an initial position). Later on, it also accepted both a decorative role (as an initial letter of a word, even if there was no iotation) and an orthographical role, to make the distinction between certain homonymical forms (mostly between plural and singular).

New Church Slavonic 
Since the mid-17th century, the Church Slavonic orthography has the following main rules related to the usage of shapes Є and Е:
 in an initial position, always use Є;
 otherwise, use Е with the following exceptions:
 in noun's endings, use -євъ and -ємъ for plural and -евъ, -емъ for singular;
 in other endings, suffixes and roots of nouns, adjectives, participles, numerals and pronouns, use Є for plural/dual, if there exists a homonymous form in the singular (either of the same word or a different one; the actual rule is much more complicated and not well-defined, as there are multiple other ways to eliminate such homonymy);
 publishers from Kyiv also use Є in the genitive case of three pronouns (менє, тебє, себє), and Е in the accusative case (мене, тебе, себе);
 as a numerical sign (with value 5) use Є, not Е (the rule has often been ignored outside of the Russian Empire).

In the modern Church Slavonic alphabet, the 6th letter is typically shown as Єєе (one uppercase accompanied with two variants of lowercase).

The different shapes Є and Е exist only in lowercase; thus in all caps and small caps styles, the distinction between Є and Е disappears.

Old Believers print their books using an older variant of New Church Slavonic language. Its orthography combines the fully formal system described above with the older tradition to use Є phonetically (after vowels, to represent iotated ).

Similar characters 
The United States Federal Geographic Data Committee uses Ꞓ, a character similar to capital Є, to represent the Cambrian Period in geologic history.

Є is similar to the symbol for the euro currency .

Related letters and other similar characters
Ε ε : Greek letter Epsilon
Ɛ ɛ : Latin letter Epsilon
Е е : Cyrillic letter Ye
Ё ё : Cyrillic letter Yo
Э э : Cyrillic letter E
Ԑ ԑ : Cyrillic letter Reversed Ze
E e : Latin letter E
Ê ê : Latin letter E with circumflex - a Gagauz, Kurdish, Podlachian, and Vietnamese letter
Ꞓ ꞓ : Latin letter Ꞓ
∈ or ∊: Element (mathematics)

Computing codes

References

Further reading
 Півторак Г. П. Український алфавіт // Українська мова: Енциклопедія. — К.: Українська енциклопедія, 2000.  — С. 679—680. (H. Pivtorak, "Ukrainian Alphabet")

External links

Cyrillic letters
Ukrainian language